Basilica of Saint Lawrence may refer to:

Basilica of San Lorenzo, Florence, Italy
Basilica of St. Lawrence, Asheville, North Carolina